Lee Tae-sung (born Lee Sung-deok on April 21, 1985) is a South Korean actor. He is known for his roles in 26 Years Diary, Playful Kiss, Rooftop Prince and My Golden Life and is currently a cast member of the reality show My Little Old Boy.

Early life
The elder of two sons, Lee was born and raised in Ansan, Gyeonggi Province. His younger brother is singer Sung Yu-bin (born 1987), who is a member of the band BOB4. Lee was a baseball player in his youth and had aspired to play professionally before constant injuries forced him to give up the sport during his senior year. He graduated from Ansan Technical High School where he was schoolmates with St. Louis Cardinals pitcher Kim Kwang-hyun.

Career
Lee's first credited role was as baseball player Koo Chun-seo in the sports film Superstar Mr. Gam. He was cast in his first lead role in the 2005 film Blossom Again opposite veteran actress Kim Jung-eun and was nominated for Best New Actor at the Blue Dragon Film Awards and Baeksang Arts Awards. His next film was the 2006 Japanese-South Korean co-production 26 Years Diary, in which he portrayed the Korean student who was killed trying to save a man who had fallen off the platform at the Shin-Ōkubo Station. It garnered him much attention in Japan due to the high profile nature of the actual incident, which had occurred in 2001. He was cast in the second male lead role in the romantic comedy Two Outs in the Ninth Inning, in which he played a college baseball player aspiring to go professional. After a stint of playing mostly protagonist roles, he portrayed the villainous nemesis of Park Yoo-chun in the sageuk fusion drama Rooftop Prince followed by the scheming son of a chaebol family in Pots of Gold.

Following his discharge from the military in July 2015, Lee's comeback project was the MBC weekend drama My Mom. He then starred in the KBS drama My Golden Life, which began airing in late 2017 and became a ratings hit domestically.

In April 2020, Lee and his mother joined the cast of the reality show My Little Old Boy.

In December 2021, Lee released his first solo exhibition 'Lee Motion' and made his debut as a painter.

In June 2022, Lee will hold a second art exhibition, starting from June 21, 2022, until July 20.

Personal life
Lee played for the celebrity amateur baseball team Playboys, alongside the likes of fellow actors Kim Seung-woo and Yoon Hyun-min.

Lee secretly registered his marriage in April 2012 to his non-celebrity girlfriend. The couple have a son who was born in 2011, a day before the death of his paternal grandmother. They separated before he enlisted for his military service and eventually divorced after three years of marriage. He has primary custody of their son.

Lee entered his mandatory military service on October 29, 2013 at 32nd Division training camp in Gongju, South Chungcheong Province. As he was a single father, he was granted reservist status, which meant that he could commute to his duty station from home after the five weeks of basic military training. He was discharged in July 2015.

Filmography

Film

Television series

Television show

Music video

Discography

Album
Lee Tae-sung: "When A Man Is In Love" (2007)

Soundtrack contribution
Lee Tae-sung: "Like The First Time" (Romance Zero OST, 2009)
Lee Tae-sung: "Talking To Myself" (Playful Kiss OST, 2010)
Hunter: "I Want To Be The Only Man For You" (City Hunter Special OST, 2011)

Awards and nominations

Notes

References

External links
  

1985 births
Living people
People from Ansan
South Korean male film actors
South Korean male television actors